Member of the Inner Magic Circle
Mohi-ud-Din Islamic Medical College